is an ancient name of a plain in the Settsu Province of Japan, presently in Osaka Prefecture, south of Yodo River and west of . It was the scene of several battles during the Sengoku period.

References

 

Plains of Japan
Landforms of Osaka Prefecture